Muzio Gaeta (1663–1728) was a Roman Catholic prelate who served as Archbishop of Bari-Canosa (1698–1728) and Titular Patriarch of Jerusalem (1708–1728).

Biography
Muzio Gaeta was born in 1663 in Naples, Italy.
On 19 May 1689, he was ordained as deacon and on 22 May 1689 he was ordained a priest.
On 7 April 1698, he was appointed during the papacy of Pope Innocent XII as Archbishop of Bari-Canosa.
On 13 April 1698, he was consecrated bishop by Fabrizio Spada, Cardinal-Priest of San Crisogono with Michelangelo dei Conti, Titular Archbishop of Tarsus, and Francesco Acquaviva d'Aragona, Titular Archbishop of Larissa in Thessalia, serving as co-consecrators.
On 14 May 1708, he was appointed during the papacy of Pope Clement XI as Titular Patriarch of Jerusalem.
He served as Archbishop of Bari-Canosa and Titular Patriarch of Jerusalem until his death on 7 March 1728.

While bishop, he was the principal co-consecrator of Simone Paolo Aleotti, Bishop of Civita Castellana e Orte (1698).

Notes

External links and additional sources
 (for Chronology of Bishops) 
 (for Chronology of Bishops) [[Wikipedia:SPS|* (for Chronology of Bishops) 
 (for Chronology of Bishops) 

17th-century Italian Roman Catholic archbishops
18th-century Italian Roman Catholic archbishops
Bishops appointed by Pope Innocent XII
Bishops appointed by Pope Clement XI
1663 births
1728 deaths